This name uses Portuguese naming customs: the first or maternal family name is Djaló and the second or paternal family name is Nandigna.
Adiato Djaló Nandigna (born 6 November 1958) is a Bissau-Guinean politician and a former acting Prime Minister of Guinea-Bissau. Her government was overthrown in the 2012 Guinea-Bissau coup d'état, and she was arrested by the security services in 2013. She later returned as the Minister of Defence in the 2015 cabinet of Prime Minister Carlos Correia.

Political career
By 2008, Adiato Djaló Nandigna was serving as the Minister for Culture, Youth and Sports within the government of Guinea-Bissau.

She was acting Prime Minister of Guinea-Bissau from 10 February to 12 April 2012. She was the first prime minister appointed by her predecessor (as the interim president can not appoint the prime minister) and also the first female holder of the office. She also served as the government's spokeswoman. She had previously been the Minister for Communications under Prime Minister Carlos Gomes Júnior, who resigned his office in order to campaign for the vacant Presidency following the death of Malam Bacai Sanhá. 

She was deposed in a coup d'état, along with the Acting President Raimundo Pereira and other civilian government members. During the coup, she came under fire directly. Nandigna was arrested on 21 November 2013 by the Guinea-Bissau intelligence and security services, a move which was criticised by the Guinean Human Rights League.

After becoming an adviser to President José Mário Vaz, she was named to the post of Minister of Defence in 2015 under acting Prime Minister Carlos Correia. She continued in this role in 2016, when she spoke of the difficulties in tackling drug smuggling around the Bissagos Islands.

References

1958 births
African Party for the Independence of Guinea and Cape Verde politicians
Female defence ministers
Female foreign ministers
Women rulers in Africa
Living people
Members of the National People's Assembly (Guinea-Bissau)
Prime Ministers of Guinea-Bissau
Women prime ministers
21st-century women politicians
Women government ministers of Guinea-Bissau